Polygonum ramosissimum is a North American species of herbaceous annual plants in the buckwheat family, widespread across much of Canada and the United States, where it is commonly called bushy knotweed. It is susceptible to downy mildew caused by the oomycete species Peronospora americana.

Description
Polygonum ramosissimum has erect stems growing  (sometimes to 200 cm or 80 inches) tall, with yellowish-green to blue-green foliage. The greenish-yellow, rarely pink or white marked flowers, are on pedicels that are longer than the calyx. The achenes also have a smooth shiny surface. The late season achenes are larger, from 4 to 15 mm long.

Subspecies
There are a number of forms and two subspecies, that vary in flower and foliage coloration. Polygonum ramosissimum has great morphological variability, which is notable on the same plant, between flowers and fruits produced early in the blooming season verses those produced late in the season, plants also show great variation over geographical areas. The following names are widely recognized.
Polygonum ramosissimum subsp. prolificum (Small) Costea & Tardif
Polygonum ramosissimum subsp. ramosissimum

In Maryland, the species is listed as endangered or extirpated from the state, in Pennsylvania it has been exterminated from the state, and New Hampshire lists it as threatened.

References

External links
photo of herbarium specimen at Missouri Botanical Garden, collected in Missouri in 1918

ramosissimum
Flora of Canada
Flora of the United States
Plants described in 1803
Taxa named by André Michaux